SS Juvenal was an oil tanker that was built in Italy in 1928 and registered in Argentina. When built she was the largest ship in the Argentinian registry.

Building
Cantiere Navale Triestino built Juvenal in Monfalcone, near Trieste, Italy, launching her on 3 June 1928 and completing her in August.

Juvenal was only slightly smaller than the tanker , which was then the largest in the World and had been completed in Bremen that February.

They supplied steam at 200 lbf/in2 to a pair of triple expansion engines built by the North East Marine Engineering Co Ltd of Sunderland, England. Between them the engines developed a total of 1,167 NHP and propelled her by twin screws.

Career
Juvenal was built for the Compañia General de Combustibles, who owned her until 1968.

In 1932 Juvenal was assigned the code letters NSOP. In 1934 these were superseded by the call sign LOFU. The echo sounder seems to have been removed in 1935. In 1936 Juvenal was still Argentina's largest merchant ship.

In the Second World War off the northern coast of Brazil Juvenal rescued a survivor from Bank Line's  cargo ship , which  had sunk by torpedo on 27 December 1942. Juvenal was bound for Curaçao in the Netherlands Antilles, where she put the survivor ashore on 8 January.

In 1968 Juvenals ownership passed to the Transmaritima del Plata Compañia de Naviera SAC. She was scrapped in December 1972.

References

Bibliography

See also
, a tanker built for Compañia General de Combustibles in 1924

1928 ships
Merchant ships of Argentina
Oil tankers
Ships built in Trieste
Steamships of Argentina
Tankers of Argentina